Klauck is a surname of German origin. Notable people with the surname include:

Hans-Josef Klauck (born 1946), German-born theologian, religious historian, and Franciscan priest
Horst Klauck (1931–2004), German footballer

References

Surnames of German origin